Son of the White Mare is a 1981 Hungarian animated fantasy adventure film directed by Marcell Jankovics. The story's main character is Fehérlófia (Son of the White Mare), who has superhuman powers. It is based on the narrative poetry, under the same title, from László Arany and ancient Hunnic, Avaric and Hungarian legends; as a tribute to ancient steppe peoples.

Plot
Fanyüvő (Treeshaker) is born as the third son of a horse, and he gains his power by suckling the horse's milk. He listens to old tales, mostly about the Forefather and the end of his reign, caused by evil humanoid dragons freed by the three wives of the three sons of the Forefather. After the horse's death, Fanyüvő decided to search and destroy the dragons, who seized power over the world. He met his two brothers, Kőmorzsoló (Stonecrumbler) and Vasgyúró (Ironrubber), who each have superhuman abilities also. In search of the Underworld's entrance (home of the humanoid dragons), they accommodate themselves in a tree hollow. One of them stays there every day, in order to cook porridge and make rope while the other two search for the entrance. An ancient and mischievous creature, Hétszűnyű Kapanyányi Monyók (Sevenwinged Skullsized Gnome) keeps asking them to give him some porridge. Kőmorzsoló and Vasgyúró refuse to give him food, so Hétszűnyű attacks them and eats the mush from their belly. Fanyüvő, however, stops him by trapping his beard in the tree hollow. Trying to escape, Hétszűnyű fells the tree, and the heroes find the entrance of the Underworld under its roots.

Only Fanyüvő dares to go down there, where he finds the three humanoid dragons and three princesses. After the victory, Kőmorzsoló and Vasgyúró rescue the princesses but, Fanyüvő puts apples, each containing a castle, into the cauldron, and although both brothers and the princesses try to lift it, it is too heavy for them. The opening closes and Fanyüvő is left down in the Underworld. The desperate Fanyüvő finds a griffin's nest. A snake tries to eat the griffin chicks, but Fanyüvő stops it. To show his gratitude, the Griffin Father takes Fanyüvő to the upper world. The trip is very long so the griffin has to get some food in order to survive. Finally, Fanyüvő has to cut off his own legs to give something to the griffin to eat.

After the arrival, the griffin chicks restore Fanyüvő's legs, which gives him more power. He is very angry at his brothers, for he believes they left him behind on purpose, but finally, he forgives them. All three marry with one of the princesses and move into castles, and the Forefather restores the power which he lost by the dragon's arrival. Eventually, each three men died and the end of the film consists of Fanyüvő walking above buildings.

Production
The film was made from 1979 to 1981. It is the second animated feature-length film of Jankovics.

Comparison with mythology
There are slight differences between Fehérlófia and the film. In Son of the White Mare, Fehérlófia and Fanyűvő (Treeshaker) are the same person. The film contains elements of creation myths, namely Ősanya (Progenitrix), Ősapa (Forefather), and the Világfa or world tree.

Reception and legacy
Son of the White Mare was placed #49 on the Olympiad of Animation in 1984. On Metacritic, the film has a weighted average score of 90 out of 100 based on 5 critic reviews, indicating "Universal Acclaim".

Animation historian Charles Solomon listed it, under the title The White Mare's Son, as one of the best animated films of the 1980s.

The film, under the title The White Mare, premiered at the Los Angeles International Animation Celebration in September 1985.

Restoration
A 4K restoration was done on the film by Los Angeles studio Arbelos Films. The restoration originally screened at the 2019 Fantasia International Film Festival on July 28, 2019, and there were plans to release it theatrically, but due to the COVID-19 pandemic these plans were soon cancelled. It was instead released on Vimeo on August 17, 2020, marking the first time that the film was distributed in America in decades. A Blu-Ray of the film by Arbelos was released on June 8, 2021, also featuring some of Jankovics' earlier films, including Academy Award-nominated Sisyphus and Johnny Corncob.

References

External links
 
 
 
 Fehérlófia – the original story by László Arany 
MUBI Interview

1980s fantasy adventure films
1981 animated films
1981 films
Animated feature films
Ethnography
Hungarian animated films
Hungarian fantasy films
Fantasy adventure films
Films based on Finno-Ugric mythology
Films directed by Marcell Jankovics
Psychedelic films